Dazet Wilfried Armel Zaha (born 10 November 1992) is a professional footballer who plays as a forward for  club Crystal Palace and the Ivory Coast national team.

Zaha advanced into the Crystal Palace first team from their academy, in 2010. In his first three full seasons at Selhurst Park, he scored 18 goals in all competitions. In January 2013, he was transferred to Manchester United for an initial fee of £10 million (the most expensive Crystal Palace player sold at the time). Zaha remained on loan at Palace until the end of the season, helping them return to the Premier League. After an unsuccessful 2013–14 season with Manchester United (mostly spent on loan at Cardiff City), Zaha returned to Palace in August 2014 on a season-long loan, before rejoining the club on a permanent basis in February 2015. He has since become the club's 12th-highest goal scorer.

Born in the Ivory Coast, Zaha grew up in England from age four. He made his debut for the England national team in 2012, appearing in two non-competitive matches (the latter of which came in 2013). After not playing for England for four years, he switched to play for Ivory Coast ahead of the 2017 Africa Cup of Nations.

Early life
Born in Abidjan, Ivory Coast, Zaha moved with his family – including his eight siblings – to Thornton Heath in the London Borough of Croydon, at age four. He was educated at Whitehorse Manor Junior School, Thornton Heath and Selsdon High School, Selsdon.

He played football at school, and joined the Crystal Palace academy aged 12.

Club career

Crystal Palace

2009–10 season
Zaha was given his Crystal Palace first-team debut at home to Cardiff City on 27 March 2010 by caretaker manager Paul Hart as a substitute for Stern John with 10 minutes remaining in the 2–1 loss. He signed a two-year professional contract with Palace in April.

2010–11 season
He quickly progressed through the ranks at Palace and became a key member of the first team during the 2010–11 pre-season friendlies. On 7 August 2010, he scored his first senior goal in a 3–2 win over Leicester City. Zaha assisted Kieron Cadogan in the home match against Queens Park Rangers in October and James Vaughan in the away match against Watford in February 2011. On 12 April 2011, he was sent off in the 95th minute against Leicester City for an alleged stamp on Patrick van Aanholt but it was later rescinded. Zaha ended the season playing a total of 44 matches, while scoring 1 goal and having 2 assists in all competitions.

2011–12 season

Zaha started the 2011–12 season by scoring two goals in a League Cup match on 23 August 2011 at home to Crawley Town. On 30 November, Zaha impressed in Crystal Palace's 2–1 shock win over Manchester United in the League Cup, constantly sneaking through the United defence and in January, attracting interest from Liverpool and Manchester United.

In March 2012, Zaha was voted The Football League's Young Player of the Year.

In the latter part of the season, manager Dougie Freedman opted to play Zaha as a striker and on 21 April he scored in a 2–2 draw with Reading, in a match that saw Reading secure the Championship title. At the end of the 2011–12 season, Zaha was voted Crystal Palace Young Player of the Year for a second time in a row. During this season, he made 48 appearances while scoring 9 goals and recording 5 assists.

2012–13 season

Zaha started the 2012–13 season brightly, getting an assist in the League Cup against Exeter City and winning a penalty in the first league match against Watford. Zaha scored his first two goals of the season against Wolverhampton Wanderers on 2 October 2012. He then scored two goals in a match again, four days later, in a 4–3 win over Burnley.

On 5 March 2013, Zaha scored his first goal for Crystal Palace since being loaned back from Manchester United, in a 4–2 victory against promotion rivals Hull City. On 13 May 2013, in the second leg of the play-off semi-final against Brighton & Hove Albion, Zaha scored two goals in the second half to put Crystal Palace into the play-off final at Wembley Stadium. In the play-off final on 27 May 2013, Zaha won a penalty that was converted to secure Crystal Palace a Premier League spot for the 2013–14 season.

Manchester United

On 25 January 2013, Zaha agreed to join Premier League club Manchester United, and would immediately be loaned back to Crystal Palace for the remainder of the season. Palace tried to delay the transfer and agree the transfer in the summer of 2013, but Football League rules prevented this with the player having to join United and be loaned back to Palace. Zaha passed the medical at Manchester United, signing a five-and-a-half-year contract on 26 January 2013 for a reported £10m rising to £15m with performance-related add-ons.

On 11 August 2013, Zaha made his debut for Manchester United in the 2013 FA Community Shield against Wigan Athletic. He was included in the starting line-up and played 61 minutes before being replaced by Antonio Valencia as he won his first major honour in football. He did not play again until 29 October, starting in a 4–0 win over Norwich City in the third round of the League Cup at Old Trafford. His Premier League debut was on 7 December in a 1–0 home loss to Newcastle United, as a substitute for Nani shortly after his team conceded.

On 31 January 2014, Zaha completed a loan move to Cardiff City for the remainder of the 2013–14 season after being left out of favour by manager David Moyes.

At the end of the season, following Moyes' sacking, Zaha said that he was never given a chance by the Scot. He contrasted his experience with that of Raheem Sterling, another young attacker who was given a chance by Liverpool after a difficult start. He also said that he was upset by false and malicious online rumours about his personal life.

Return to Crystal Palace

2014–15 season
On 28 August 2014, Zaha agreed to a season-long loan deal with Crystal Palace. Two days later, in the first match of his loan, he scored a stoppage-time equaliser in a 3–3 draw at Newcastle United. On 2 February 2015, the final day of the winter transfer window, Zaha's move to Palace was made permanent with the signing of a five-and-a-half-year contract for an undisclosed fee, believed to be in the region of £3 million, rising to £6 million with add-ons; Manchester United will also receive a percentage of the fee if Palace sell Zaha in the future.

Zaha played regularly for Crystal Palace throughout the season, finishing the season with four goals and two assists as Crystal Palace finished the league in 10th place.

2015–16 season
Again, Zaha was a regular for Crystal Palace in this season, making 34 appearances, scoring two goals and recording one assist, while Crystal Palace finished in 15th place. He helped Crystal Palace reach the 2016 FA Cup Final, by playing in every match since the third round entry and scoring two goals along the way. Zaha played the whole 120 minutes in the final, but could not help Palace to a victory, as Manchester United won 2–1. Zaha won the Crystal Palace Player of the Year award for the first time.

2016–17 season
On 26 December 2016, Zaha was denied a penalty in the closing minutes against Watford. Some speculated that Zaha had overplayed the foul or taken a dive. After the match Watford's mascot attempted to rile Zaha up by mimicking a dive in front of him. On 14 May 2017, Zaha scored the opening goal in the third minute of the Crystal Palace Hull city game that simultaneously mathematically secured Crystal Palace's top flight status and relegated Hull City to the Championship. After another outstanding season with The Eagles, Zaha won Crystal Palace's Player of the Year award for the second year running. On 26 May 2017, Zaha signed a new five-year contract with Crystal Palace.

2017–18 season

On 14 October 2017, Zaha returned to Palace's starting line-up for the first time in two months and scored to open a 2–1 win over Chelsea to give the Eagles their first points of the season. He was Premier League Player of the Month for April 2018 for his four goals and assist while playing up front; on 14 April he scored twice in the first half of a 3–2 win over rivals Brighton & Hove Albion.

Despite their poor start, Palace stayed up with a game in hand under new manager Roy Hodgson, with the combination between Zaha and fellow winger Andros Townsend a key factor. He was named their Player of the Year for the third time in a row, a feat only done before by goalkeeper Julián Speroni.

2018–19 season
In Palace's first game of the new season on 11 August, Zaha scored the second goal of a 2–0 win at Fulham. It was his 23rd Premier League goal for the club, drawing level with Chris Armstrong as their top scorer in the competition's history. Four days later he signed a new five-year contract at Crystal Palace. On 26 August, with a consolation goal in a 2–1 loss at Watford, he overtook Armstrong to become Palace's Premier League top scorer.

After scoring a winning goal against Huddersfield Town in September 2018, Zaha publicly complained about what he considered to be a lack of appropriate protection by referees against fouls, saying that he would need a broken leg before any action would be taken. Data proved that in the last five years, he was the second most fouled player in the league after Eden Hazard. In October, Zaha was the victim of racist abuse and death threats following a match. Zaha received a red card for dissent against Southampton on 30 January 2019.

In June 2019, he was linked with a transfer to Arsenal, who made a £40 million offer for the player, which Crystal Palace rejected as too low. In October, he received racial abuse on social media.`

2019–20 season
Zaha played in all 38 league matches with Crystal Palace, having a disappointing campaign, scoring only 4 goals, including a long-distance goal against Chelsea.

2020–21 season
On 12 September 2020, Zaha scored the only goal in a 1–0 win over Southampton. On 19 September, he scored a brace in a 3–1 away win over his former team Manchester United.

On 13 March 2021, Zaha became the first Premier League player not to take a knee prior to kick-off in Palace's 1–0 win over West Bromwich Albion. Zaha made a statement at the Financial Times’ Business of Football summit in February saying that "As a society, I feel we should be encouraging better education in schools, and social media companies should be taking stronger action against people who abuse others online – not just footballers".

On 16 May, Zaha scored his 11th league goal of the season in a 3–2 win against Aston Villa, setting a new personal best for goals in a Premier League season.

2021–22 season
On 27 September 2021, Zaha marked his 400th appearance for Crystal Palace with his 70th goal in a 1–1 draw with rivals Brighton & Hove Albion.

On 30 October 2021, Zaha became the first player to score 50 top-flight goals for Crystal Palace in a 2–0 win at Manchester City.

International career
Zaha was eligible to represent both the Ivory Coast, the country of his birth, and England, where he grew up.

England (2011–2013)
His success over the course of his first full season resulted in a call-up to the England under-19 team for their match against Germany in February 2011. He was called up to the under-21 team on 23 February 2012. He made his debut in a 4–0 win against Belgium on 29 February, assisting Henri Lansbury for the third goal. On 11 November 2012, Zaha was called up to the senior team by manager Roy Hodgson for a friendly match against Sweden on 14 November. He came on as a substitute for fellow debutant Raheem Sterling in the 83rd minute.

When Zaha was in good form for Crystal Palace under Hodgson ahead of the 2018 FIFA World Cup, the manager said that he regretted not fielding the winger in a competitive game to tie him to England.

Ivory Coast (2016–present)
On 27 November 2016, the Ivorian Football Federation confirmed that Zaha had sent correspondence to FIFA to switch his international football allegiance from England to the Ivory Coast. In response to this development, England manager Gareth Southgate indicated he would try to dissuade Zaha from changing allegiance due to his consistent club form.

In January, Zaha was named in the Ivory Coast squad for the 2017 Africa Cup of Nations. He made his debut against Sweden in a friendly in Abu Dhabi on 8 January, coming on as a half-time substitute and assisting Giovanni Sio's goal in a 2–1 win. Three days later, against Uganda at the same venue, he made his first international start and scored his first goal in a 3–0 win. At the tournament in Gabon, the reigning champion Elephants were eliminated at the group stage, with Zaha starting each game.

Zaha was also called up for the 2019 Africa Cup of Nations in Egypt. He scored two goals at the tournament, one in a 4–1 win over Namibia in the final group game, and the game's only goal in the last 16 match against Mali. The Elephants were defeated on penalties in the quarter final by the eventual winners, Algeria.

Style of play
Zaha can play as a forward or as a winger, usually on the left where he can cut inside with his right foot. In 2018, Adrian Clarke of the Premier League's website opined that he "offers more threat" as a frontman, going on to add that "his ultra-mobile combination with [Andros] Townsend generates more goals and points", citing "the speed, athleticism and unpredictable movement of the Zaha-Townsend axis is more difficult for opponents to contain". This often forces defenders to resort to stopping him by committing fouls, with Zaha having induced the most red cards for opponents in the history of the Premier League.

Zaha has been accused of diving; however, Roy Hodgson, who managed him at club level for Crystal Palace and internationally for England, has stated: "Wilf Zaha does not dive for penalties. He gets knocked over sometimes – sometimes he gets knocked over or unbalanced without it being a penalty or a foul – because he runs at such speed and has such agility with the ball. But he certainly doesn't dive." Hodgson also said that Zaha's characterisation as a diver is because of a "campaign" and it causes fouls against him to be dismissed by referees.

Career statistics

Club

International

As of match played 19 November 2022. Ivory Coast score listed first, score column indicates score after each Zaha goal.

Honours
Crystal Palace
Football League Championship play-offs: 2013
FA Cup runner-up: 2015–16

Manchester United
FA Community Shield: 2013

Individual
Football League Young Player of the Month: October 2012
Football League Young Player of the Year: 2013
PFA Team of the Year: 2012–13 Championship
Crystal Palace Player of the Year: 2015–16, 2016–17, 2017–18
Premier League Player of the Month: April 2018
Premier League Goal of the Month: February 2022

See also
List of England international footballers born outside England

References

External links

Profile at the Crystal Palace F.C. website

1992 births
Living people
Footballers from Abidjan
People from Thornton Heath
Footballers from the London Borough of Croydon
English footballers
England youth international footballers
England under-21 international footballers
England international footballers
Ivorian footballers
Ivory Coast international footballers
Association football wingers
Association football forwards
Crystal Palace F.C. players
Manchester United F.C. players
Cardiff City F.C. players
English Football League players
Premier League players
2017 Africa Cup of Nations players
2019 Africa Cup of Nations players
Dual internationalists (football)
Black British sportsmen
English people of Ivorian descent
FA Cup Final players
2021 Africa Cup of Nations players
Ivorian emigrants to the United Kingdom